The Women's singles competition at the 2020 FIL World Luge Championships was held on 15 February 2020.

Results
The first run was held at 16:18 and the second run at 18:05.

References

Women's singles